Faulkner is an unincorporated community in Cherokee County, Kansas, United States.  It is located southeast of Oswego along SW 100th St.

History
Faulkner was a shipping point on the Missouri Pacific Railroad.

Economy
Faulkner has one business, Faulkner Grain.

References

Further reading

External links
 USD 493, local school district
 Cherokee County maps: Current, Historic, KDOT

Unincorporated communities in Cherokee County, Kansas
Unincorporated communities in Kansas